Patrick Hogan (10 October 1885 – 24 January 1969) was an Irish Labour Party politician who served as Ceann Comhairle of Dáil Éireann from 1951 to 1967 and Leas-Cheann Comhairle of Dáil Éireann from 1927 to 1928, 1932 to 1938 and 1948 to 1951. He served as a Teachta Dála (TD) for the Clare constituency from 1923 to 1938 and 1943 to 1969. He was a Senator for the Labour Panel from 1938 to 1943.

Early life
Hogan was born on 10 October 1885, the only son of Patrick Hogan, a labourer, and Bridget O'Connor of Culleen, Kilmaley, County Clare. In the 1901 Census, his occupation is given as house-to-house postman.

When he entered the King's Inns in 1932, he gave his birth date as 8 October 1891.

Political career
As a young man he joined Conradh na Gaeilge and the Irish Volunteers; however, he was deported to England for his activities. During the Irish War of Independence he fought against the Black and Tans in County Clare. After the Anglo-Irish Treaty he became an official with the Irish Transport and General Workers' Union (ITGWU). He was elected to Dáil Éireann as a Labour Party Teachta Dála (TD) for the Clare constituency in 1923. He lost his seat at the 1938 general election, and was subsequently elected to Seanad Éireann on the Labour Panel. 

While sitting in the Dáil, he qualified as a barrister-at-law and was called to the bar in 1936. He remained in the Seanad until 1943 when he returned to the Dáil at the 1943 general election. He lost his Dáil seat again at the 1944 general election, but regained it at the 1948 general election. In 1951 he became Ceann Comhairle of Dáil Éireann, a position he held until his retirement in 1967. He welcomed United States President John F. Kennedy to the house on 28 June 1963 during his visit to Ireland.

He died in office on  24 January 1969.

References

 

1885 births
1969 deaths
Labour Party (Ireland) TDs
Labour Party (Ireland) senators
Members of the 4th Dáil
Members of the 5th Dáil
Members of the 6th Dáil
Members of the 7th Dáil
Members of the 8th Dáil
Members of the 9th Dáil
Members of the 3rd Seanad
Members of the 11th Dáil
Members of the 13th Dáil
Members of the 14th Dáil
Members of the 15th Dáil
Members of the 16th Dáil
Members of the 17th Dáil
Members of the 18th Dáil
Politicians from County Clare
Presiding officers of Dáil Éireann
Alumni of King's Inns